The Oconaluftee Baptist Church, also known as the Smokemont Baptist Church is a historic Baptist church in Great Smoky Mountains National Park, near Cherokee, North Carolina. It is located off United States Route 441, overlooking the Smokemont Campground of the park. This church building was built in 1912 for a congregation organized in 1836. The congregation's records (which extend only to 1895) form a valuable documentation of local history. The church remained in active use until the area was made part of the national park in 1935, and has seen occasional use since then.

The church was listed on the National Register of Historic Places in 1976.

The church was the site of a fatal stabbing on March 29, 2015, which occurred inside the building.

See also
National Register of Historic Places listings in Swain County, North Carolina
National Register of Historic Places listings in Great Smoky Mountains National Park

References

Baptist churches in North Carolina
Churches on the National Register of Historic Places in North Carolina
Churches completed in 1912
Buildings and structures in Swain County, North Carolina
National Register of Historic Places in Great Smoky Mountains National Park
National Register of Historic Places in Swain County, North Carolina
1836 establishments in North Carolina